Two ships of the Royal Navy have been named HMS Hereward :

  a  laid down in 1912, her name was changed to HMS Laverock before launch
  a  launched in 1936 and sunk in 1941

Royal Navy ship names